Didihat Legislative Assembly constituency is one of the 70 Legislative Assembly constituencies of Uttarakhand state in India.

It is part of Pithoragarh district.

Member of the Legislative Assembly

Election results

2022

2017

See also
 List of constituencies of the Uttarakhand Legislative Assembly
 Pithoragarh district

References

External links
 

Pithoragarh district
Assembly constituencies of Uttarakhand